Šiauliai city municipality stadium, known as Šiauliai Central Stadium for UEFA competitions, is a multi-use stadium in Šiauliai, Lithuania.  It is currently used mostly for football matches and is the home stadium of FA Šiauliai and FC Gintra.  The stadium holds 4,000 people.

Football venues in Lithuania
Sport in Šiauliai
Buildings and structures in Šiauliai